Cuno Hugo Rudolph (1860-1932) was a Washington, D.C. politician who served as the 10th and 14th president of the Board of Commissioners of the District of Columbia, from 1910 to 1913 and again from 1921 to 1926. He was the only person to hold this office for two, non-consecutive periods.

Early life
Rudolph, the son of Jacob and Elizabeth Yerger Rudolph, was born in Baltimore, Maryland in 1860 where he attended private schools and business colleges. He moved to Washington, D.C. in 1899 and become engaged in the hardware business, and served as the president of the hardware firm Rudolph and West until 1906. Rudolph married Amy Edna Merz (1868-1951) on June 8, 1901, and the couple had no children.

Rudolph expanded his business into bricks and banking and became active in politics as a Republican.

Career
In 1901, as chairman of the Associated Charities' Public Playground Committee, he opened the first public playground in the District of Columbia, and he remained active in playgrounds in the District for years. He served on inaugural committees and led the George Washington Bicentennial efforts in DC until poor health forced him to resign. He was on the board of trustees at Howard University, served as chairman of the Board of the Children's Hospital and organized the first Mother's Day celebration in DC in 1911. He was a vice president of the Washington D.C. Board of Trade, and was the director of the Washington D.C., Chamber of Commerce.

He was first appointed to the District of Columbia Board of Commissioners in 1910 by President Howard Taft and quickly elected the Board's president, a role he filled until he resigned in March 1913 when President Woodrow Wilson was inaugurated. He then back to banking, service as vice-president of the Second National Bank of Washington until President Harding again appointed him to the Board of Commissioners, and again elected its president. He was reappointed by President Coolidge and continued to serve until 1926 when he resigned again due to poor health.

Death and honors
Rudolph died in 1932, at his home in the Dresden Apartments on Connecticut Avenue. After a service in DC, he was buried at Lorraine Park Cemetery in Baltimore.

The Cuno H. Rudolph Elementary School building, now home to Washington Latin Public Charter School, was named in his honor in 1940.

References

External links

1860 births
1932 deaths
Politicians from Baltimore
Mayors of Washington, D.C.
Members of the Board of Commissioners for the District of Columbia
People from Washington, D.C.
20th-century American politicians